Tangled Evidence is a 1934 British crime film directed by George A. Cooper and starring Sam Livesey, Joan Marion and Michael Hogan. It was made by Twickenham Studios and based on a 1924 novel by Rose Champion de Crespigny.

Cast
 Sam Livesey - Inspector Drayton 
 Joan Marion - Anne Wilmot 
 Michael Hogan - Ingram Underhill 
 Michael Shepley - Gilbert Morfield 
 Reginald Tate - Ellaby 
 Dick Francis - Frame 
 Edgar Norfolk - Doctor Ackland 
 John Turnbull - Moore 
 Davina Craig - Faith 
 Gillian Maude - Paula

References

External links

1934 films
1934 crime films
Films directed by George A. Cooper
Films based on British novels
Films shot at Twickenham Film Studios
British black-and-white films
British crime films
1930s English-language films
1930s British films